Banvit is a feed and poultry producer based in Bandırma, Turkey.

Business and activities 
Starting as a feed producer in 1968, Banvit gradually moved into the production of broiler chickens. Today, Banvit has the country's largest single broiler facility, able to process 16,000 birds per hour and 75 million per year. The company also has a facility in Romania, a poultry product factory in Bandırma, and the Tadpi turkey product facility in İzmir
Distribution is managed through sales offices throughout Turkey and a fleet of refrigerated trucks.

Sponsorship
Banvit sponsored the basketball club Bandırma B.İ.K. for 25 years (1994–2019), as the club was known as Banvit B.K.

See also 
List of companies of Turkey

References

Companies listed on the Istanbul Stock Exchange